A list of notable people affiliated with Trinity College at Oxford University, England. It includes former students, current and former academics and fellows, as listed in the Oxford Dictionary of National Biography or another available source. The overwhelming maleness of this list is explained by the fact that for over 90% of its history (from its foundation in 1555 until 1979), Trinity was an all-male institution.

Former students

Academics and explorers

 Kenneth Clark OM CH KCB FBA
 Sir Richard Burton KCMG FRGS (sent down)
 Sir Arthur Norrington
 Sir Arthur Quiller-Couch
 John Aubrey FRS
 Vincent Cronin FRSL
 Wlodzimierz Julian Korab-Karpowicz
 Nigel Anderson
 Miles Kington
 William Gifford Palgrave
 Mamoru Imura
 Herbert Edward Douglas Blakiston

Scientists, engineers and mathematicians

Sir John Boreham KCB
Keith J. Laidler
Justin Stebbing
Sir Harold Thompson FRS
Henry Moseley

Artists and broadcasters
 Sir Terence Rattigan CBE
 Sir John Denham
 Richard Foster
 Laurence Binyon
 George Butterworth MC
 Joyce Cary
 Justin Cartwright MBE
 Lionel Chetwynd
 David Green
 Basil Harwood
 Kit Lambert
 Walter Savage Landor
 William Lisle Bowles
 Thomas Lodge
 A. E. W. Mason
 Edward Powys Mathers
 John Middleton Murry
 Christopher Tolkien
 Simon Tolkien
 David Walter
 David Yates
 Ben Judah

Business
 Sir Angus Ogilvy KCVO
 John Preston (1950-2017), music industry executive
 Sir William Stuttaford KBE
 Sir Peter Stothard
 Tunku Varadarajan
 Huw van Steenis

Clergy and theology

 Saint John Henry Newman DD OC
 Most Reverend John Gilbert
 Right Reverend James Newcome
 Right Reverend Archibald Robertson
 Right Reverend Aubrey Aitken
 Right Reverend Dr Rupert Hoare
 Right Reverend Dr Kenneth Kirk (Chaplain 1922-33)
 Very Reverend Robert MacCarthy
 Reverend Canon Sidney Alexander
 Reverend Canon Christopher Oswald Miles
 Reverend Canon George Rawlinson
 Reverend Henry Joy Fynes-Clinton
 Reverend Montague Summers
 John Rogers
 George Blackwell
 John Arnold (bishop)

Diplomats and colonial administrators
 Albrecht von Bernstorff
 Harold Caccia, Baron Caccia, GCMG, GCVO
 Vere Henry Hobart, Lord Hobart
 Sir George Bowen GCMG
 Sir Edward Gent KCMG DSO OBE MC
 Sir Donald MacGillivray GCMG MBE

Lawyers
 Major Sir Edward Atkinson KCB CBE
 Rayner Goddard, Baron Goddard (former Lord Chief Justice)
 Peter Birks
 Philip Seaforth James
 John Lewger, first Secretary and Attorney General of Maryland, United States
 John McNeill, QC, Crown Advocate of the British Supreme Court for China and Chairman of the Hong Kong Bar Association

Military
 Major General Lord Michael Fitzalan-Howard GCVO CB CBE MC
 Captain Noel Godfrey Chavasse VC & Bar MC
 Flight Lieutenant Richard Hillary RAFVR
 Henry Ireton
 Lieutenant General Frank Klotz USAF
 Squadron Leader Dinghy Young DFC & Bar RAFVR
Sarah Oakley, Royal Navy officer

Politicians

Sports people
 Simon Danielli, rugby union player for Ulster and Scotland
 Constantine Louloudis, rower, bronze medalist in the 2012 Summer Olympics and gold medalist in the 2016 Summer Olympics
 Henry Melvin 'Dinghy' Young, RAF pilot and rower in the 1938 Boat Race
 Bonnie St. John, a medal winning Paralympic skier
 Andrew Comrie-Picard, an X Games medalist and Hollywood stuntman

Miscellaneous
 Sir Arthur fforde GBE
 Phil Harvey
 Frank Luntz
 Ross McWhirter
 Tom Riordan

Journalists
 Michael Peel
Patrick Cockburn
 Adrian Michaels

Fictional characters 
Fictional former students include Jay Gatsby, the title character of F. Scott Fitzgerald's 1925 novel The Great Gatsby who attends Trinity briefly after World War I, and Tiger Tanaka, an ally of James Bond in Ian Fleming's 1964 novel You Only Live Twice who receives a first in PPE before World War II.

Recent books in which Trinity features prominently are:

Fellows

 John Michael Hammersley FRS (1920–2004), mathematician 
 Sir Cyril Hinshelwood FRS (1897–1967), physical chemist; Nobel laureate
 Sir Henry Stuart Jones FBA (1867–1939), classicist 
 Martin Kemp (born 1942), art historian
 Ronald Knox (1888–1957), theologian
 Hans Adolf Krebs (1900–1981), biologist; Nobel laureate
 David Lambert Lack FRS (1910–1973), evolutionary biologist 
 Michael Maclagan (1914–2003), historian
 Rodney Robert Porter FRS (1917–1985), biochemist; Nobel laureate
 Sir Edwin Southern FRS (born 1938), molecular biologist
 Sir Ronald Syme FBA (1903–1989), ancient historian
 Gail Trimble (born 1982), classicist
 Thomas Warton (1728–1790), historian and poet

Presidents

The head of Trinity College, Oxford is titled the President.

16th century
Thomas Slythurst (1556–1559; first president)
Arthur Yeldard (1559–1599)
Ralph Kettell (1599–1643)

17th century
Hannibal Potter (1643–1648; first term)
Robert Harris (1648–1658)
Seth Ward (1659–1660)
Hannibal Potter (1660–1664; second term)
Ralph Bathurst (1664–1704)

18th century
Thomas Sykes (1704–1705)
William Dobson (1706–1731)
George Huddesford (1731–1776)
Joseph Chapman (1776–1808)

19th century
Thomas Lee (1808–1824)
James Ingram (1824–1850)
Samuel William Wayte (1866–1878)
John Percival (1879–1887)
Henry George Woods (1887–1897)
Henry Francis Pelham (1897–1907)

20th century
Herbert Edward Douglas Blakiston (1907–1938)
J. R. H. Weaver (1938–1954)
Arthur Norrington (1954–1970)
Alexander George Ogston (1970–1978)
Anthony Quinton (1978–1987)
John Burgh (1987–1996)
Michael Beloff (1996–2006)

21st century
Sir Ivor Roberts (2006–2017)
Dame Hilary Boulding (2017 to present)

References

Trinity College
People associated with Trinity College, Oxford